.fun is a generic top-level domain (gTLD) of the Domain Name System used on the Internet. The name is derived from the English word fun.

History 

The .fun domain was registered in December 2016. It is currently owned by Radix, a company which owns several other generic top-level domains. According to Radix, the target group of the top-level domain is for "individuals or organisations who wish to entertain the target audience."

Usage 
.fun is used by a variety of entertainment-related websites, including an Australian website which helps parents find safe places for their kids to play and an event organizer for companies.

References

External links 
 Official website
 Neal.fun

fun